This is a short timeline of women lawyers in the United States. Much more information on the subject can be found at: List of first women lawyers and judges in the United States

 1869 – Arabella Mansfield became the first female lawyer in the United States when she was admitted to the Iowa bar.
 1870 – Ada Kepley became the first woman to graduate from law school in the United States; she graduated from Chicago University Law School, predecessor to Union College of Law, later known as Northwestern University School of Law.
 1872 – Charlotte E. Ray became the first African-American female lawyer in the United States.
 1873 - Bradwell v. State of Illinois, 83 U.S. 130 (1873), was a United States Supreme Court case that solidified the narrow reading of the Privileges or Immunities Clause of the Fourteenth Amendment, and determined that the right to practice a profession was not among these privileges. The case is also notable for being an early 14th Amendment challenge to sex discrimination in the United States. In this case the United States Supreme Court held that Illinois constitutionally denied law licenses to women, because the right to practice law was not one of the privileges and immunities guaranteed by the Fourteenth Amendment. The Illinois Supreme Court affirmed.
 1877 - On March 22, 1877, the Wisconsin legislature enacted a law which prohibited courts from denying admission to the bar on the basis of sex. The bill had been drafted by Lavinia Goodell and she worked with Speaker of the Wisconsin State Assembly John B. Cassoday for it to pass.
 1879: A law was enacted allowing qualified female attorneys to practice in any federal court in the United States. 
 1879 – Belva Lockwood became the first woman to argue before the United States Supreme Court.
 1899 –  The National Association of Women Lawyers, originally called the Women Lawyers' Club, was founded by a group of 18 women lawyers in New York City.
 1918 –  Judge Mary Belle Grossman and Mary Florence Lathrop became the first two female lawyers admitted to the American Bar Association.
 1922 – Florence E. Allen became the first woman ever elected to a state supreme court (specifically, the Ohio Supreme Court).
 1922 – Florence King became the first woman to argue a patent case before the U.S. Supreme Court.
 1923 – Florence King became the first woman to win a case before the U.S. Supreme Court in 1923 (Crown v. Nye).
 1928 – Genevieve Cline won U.S. Senate confirmation on May 25, 1928, as a judge of the United States Customs Court (now known as the Court of International Trade), received her commission on May 26, 1928, and took her oath of office in the Cleveland Federal Building on June 5, 1928, thus becoming the first American woman ever appointed to the federal bench.
 1929 - Olive H. Rabe became the first woman to argue a free speech case before the U.S. Supreme Court in 1929 (United States v. Schwimmer).
 1965 – Lorna E. Lockwood became the first woman chief justice of any state (specifically, she was chief justice of Arizona).
 1970 – Doris Brin Walker became the first female president of the National Lawyers Guild.
 1971 - Barring women from practicing law was prohibited in the U.S.
 1981 – Sandra Day O'Connor became the first woman to serve as a justice of the United States Supreme Court.
 1981 – Arnette Hubbard became the first female president of the National Bar Association.
 1984 - In Hishon v. King & Spaulding (1984) the Supreme Court ruled that Title VII of the Civil Rights Act of 1964 bans discrimination by employers in the context of any contractual employer/employee relationship, including but not limited to law partnerships.
 1988 – Juanita Kidd Stout was appointed to the Supreme Court of Pennsylvania, thus becoming the first African-American woman to serve on a state's highest court.
 1995 – Roberta Cooper Ramo became the first female president of the American Bar Association.
 2008 – Roberta Cooper Ramo became the first female president of the American Law Institute.

See also
 List of first women lawyers and judges by nationality
 List of first women lawyers and judges in the United States
 Timeline of women lawyers
 Women in law

References 

History of women in the United States
Women lawyers in the United States
Lawyers in the United States